Andrew James Duncan Laing  (20 June 1933 – 13 September 2008), generally known as Duncan Laing, was a New Zealand swimming coach based in Dunedin. He coached Olympian Danyon Loader, winner of two gold medals at the 1996 Atlanta Olympics and a silver medal at Barcelona in 1992, and Philip Rush, current world record holder for the fastest two and three way swim of the English Channel. He began teaching at Moana Pool in 1966, and over forty years training in Dunedin included 11 Olympic athletes. In 2003, Michael Phelps visited New Zealand to train under Laing. He had since retired from professional coaching, and received treatment in 2006 for melanoma on his leg and a brain tumour.

He married Betty Burgess in 1951, and they had six children, four sons and two daughters (one deceased). Besides coaching he was an Otago rugby selector in the 1980s, and ran the Moana House rehabilitation centre with his wife.

Laing was appointed an Officer of the Order of the British Empire in the 1993 Queen's Birthday Honours, and a Companion of the New Zealand Order of Merit, for services to sport, in the 2006 Queen's Birthday Honours.

He was born in New Plymouth on 20 June 1933 and died in Dunedin on 13 September 2008 at the age of 77.

One of the pools within the Moana Pool complex was renamed the Duncan Laing Pool in November 2010 in his honour.

References 

1933 births
2008 deaths
New Zealand male swimmers
New Zealand swimming coaches
Deaths from cancer in New Zealand
Companions of the New Zealand Order of Merit
New Zealand Officers of the Order of the British Empire
Sportspeople from Dunedin
Sportspeople from New Plymouth
20th-century New Zealand people
21st-century New Zealand people